Carl Wilhelm Hartmann (3 July 1880 – 25 June 1957) was a Norwegian public prosecutor, judge and politician.

Hartmann was born in Kongsberg to physician Carl Christian Andreas Hartmann and Marie Sophie Sylow Thorne, and was a brother of Paul Ernst Wilhelm Hartmann. From 1928 to 1930, he served as mayor of Skien. He was elected representative to the Storting for the period 1931–1933 under the Liberal Party.

Hartmann died on 25 June 1957.

References

1880 births
Year of death missing
People from Kongsberg
Liberal Party (Norway) politicians
Members of the Storting
Mayors of places in Telemark